Warsaw is the capital of Poland.

Warsaw may also refer to:

Music
 Joy Division, known as Warsaw 1977–1978
 Warsaw (album)
 "Warsaw" (song)
 Warsaw Concerto, by Richard Addinsell
 "Warsaw", a song by Dessa, 2013

Places

Canada
 Warsaw, Douro-Dummer,  Peterborough County, Ontario

Poland
 Warsaw metropolitan area
 Warsaw (European Parliament constituency)
 Warsaw Voivodeship (disambiguation)
 Warszawa, Greater Poland Voivodeship
 Duchy of Warsaw (1807–1815)
Warsaw concentration camp, a Nazi concentration camp (1943–1944)

United States
 Warsaw, Alabama
 Warsaw, Georgia
 Warsaw Township, Hancock County, Illinois
 Warsaw, Illinois
 Warsaw, Indiana
 Warsaw, Kentucky
 Warsaw Township, Goodhue County, Minnesota
 Warsaw Township, Rice County, Minnesota
 Warsaw, Minnesota
 Warsaw, Missouri
 Warsaw, New York
 Warsaw (village), New York
 Warsaw, North Carolina
 Warsaw, North Dakota
 Warsaw, Ohio
 Warsaw Township, Jefferson County, Pennsylvania
 Warsaw, Pennsylvania
 Warsaw, Texas
 Warsaw, Virginia

See also 

 Battle of Warsaw (disambiguation)
 Warsaw railway station (disambiguation)
 Varsovia (disambiguation)
 Warsow (disambiguation)
 Warszawa (disambiguation)
 Wausau (disambiguation)
 Treaty of Warsaw (disambiguation)
 Warsaw Convention, about international carriage by air
 Warsaw Pact, between the Soviet Union and 7 other Eastern Bloc socialist republics
 Warshaw's, a defunct supermarket in Montreal's historic Jewish district

gl:Varsovia